The 1963 NBA World Championship Series was the championship round of the 1963 NBA Playoffs, which concluded the National Basketball Association 1962–63 season. The best-of-seven series was played between the Western Division champion Los Angeles Lakers and the Eastern Division champion Boston Celtics. This was the Celtics' seventh straight trip to the championship series, and they won the series over the Lakers, 4–2.

Series summary 

Celtics win series 4–2

Team rosters

Boston Celtics

Los Angeles Lakers

See also
 1963 NBA Playoffs
 1962–63 NBA season

References 
1962-63 NBA Season Summary, basketball-reference.com. Retrieved March 28, 2014.

External links 

 1963 Finals at NBA.com
 1963 NBA Playoffs at Basketball-Reference.com

National Basketball Association Finals
NBA
NBA
Finals
Basketball competitions in Boston
Basketball competitions in Los Angeles
NBA Finals
1960s in Boston
NBA Finals
NBA Finals
NBA Finals